The 2003 Stock Car Brasil was the 27th Stock Car Brasil season. It began on March 23 at the Curitiba and ended on November 30 at Interlagos, after twelve rounds.

Teams and drivers
All cars used Chevrolet Vectra Stock Car chassis. All drivers were Brazilian-registered.

References

Stock Car Brasil
Stock Car Brasil seasons